The Al Thani Collection is a collection of art representing civilizations around the world, highlights from which are on view in the Hôtel de la Marine, on the Place de la Concorde, in Paris.  It was assembled by Sheikh Hamad bin Abdullah bin Khalifa Al Thani, first cousin of the Emir of  Qatar. Portions of the collection previously toured to different museums around the world, including the Metropolitan Museum of Art in New York, the Victoria and Albert Museum in London, and the Legion of Honor Museum in San Francisco. Beginning in late 2021 it occupied a wing of the newly restored Hotel de la Marine in Paris, under agreement with the Centre des monuments nationaux of the French Ministry of Culture. Under the agreement, it will remain for twenty years.

The collection is located in a section of the Hôtel de la Marine which formerly displayed tapestries from the French Royal Collection. It displays at one time one hundred-twenty works, out of a total of more than five thousand works in the collection. It presents objects from ancient civilizations in Europe, Asia, Africa, the Americas and the Middle East, related by theme. The exposition was designed by Tsuyoshi Tane. The first of the four galleries is called "A Window on World Civilisations", with seven objects from different cultures. The second gallery has eleven showcases, by theme. The third is reserved for temporary exhibitions. The fourth, 18 meters long, offers a tour of objects from different ancient treasuries.

One notable object is a bust carved of chalcedony of the Roman Emperor Hadrian, made at the time of the emperor, reworked in the 13th century at the court of the Holy Roman Emperor Frederic II, and then moved two centuries later to Venice, where it was set upon shoulders in armor made of gilded enamel, precious stones and pearls. Another notable work is a quartzite bust of a Princess of the Amarna Period, Egyptian New Empire, XVIII Dynasty (1351-1334 BC),

Another notable head of a royal figure is carved of red jasper, and depicts either Queen Hatshepsut or King Thutmosis III, from the 18th dynasty, a high point in Egyptian civilisation. It is believed to originally have had crown of blue faience.

The collection also contains a gold pendant from 4500-3500 BC, considered a notably early example of worked gold; a Mughal decorative bird made of gold, lacquer, rubies and emeralds; A bear-shaped gilded bronze carpet weight from the Han Dynasty in China (202-220 AD; as well as sabres, textiles, and illuminated texts of the Koran.

Another  object on display is a 16th-century tunic covered with citations from the Koran, which was worn as protection against harm under a suit of armour. It is accompanied by two sabers, made of Damascus steel, which are marked with the name of Emperor.

The collection displays a jade wine cup made for the fourth of the Mughal emperors, Jahangir in 1607-1608, the only known dated object specifically connected with an Emperor's name. The Persian text on the cup contains quotations from the Koran, and notes that it is the personal cup of the Emperor, with a date.

Bibliography (in French)
 Pommereau, Claude, "Hôtel de la Marine" (June 2021), Beaux Arts Éditions, Paris
 "Connaissance des arts" special edition, "L'Hôtel de la Marine", (in French), published September, 2021

External links

 Hotel de la Marine  (in French)
 Al Thani Collection  (In French)

Notes and Citations 

Private art collections
Islamic art